Secret Service is an American action drama television series created by Gilbert M. Shilton and George Mendeluk, which premiered on NBC on August 16, 1992 and ended on November 17, 1993 with a total of 21 episodes. The show was a re-enactment of real Secret Service cases and was hosted by Steven Ford, the youngest son of former United States President Gerald Ford and First Lady Betty Ford.

Episode titles
As of this writing, the airdates of some of the episodes are uncertain.

References

External links

1992 American television series debuts
1993 American television series endings
American action television series
1990s American crime drama television series
NBC original programming
Television series by Universal Television
Television series featuring reenactments
Television shows set in Delaware